Skyride or Sky Ride may refer to:

Aerial lifts
 Skyride (Busch Gardens Tampa Bay), an aerial lift at Busch Gardens Tampa Bay, Tampa, Florida, United States
 Skyride, an aerial lift at Busch Gardens Williamsburg, James City County, Virginia, United States
 Skyride, a defunct aerial lift at Kings Island, Mason, Ohio, United States,
 Skyride (Six Flags Great Adventure), an aerial lift at Six Flags Great Adventure, Jackson Township, New Jersey, United States
 Skyride, an aerial lift at Stone Mountain, Stone Mountain, Georgia, United States
 Skyride, an official nickname at Katsuragiyama Ropeway, Izunokuni, Shizuoka, Japan
 Skyride, an aerial lift at Alton Towers, Staffordshire, United Kingdom
 Sky Ride, an aerial lift at Cedar Point, Sandusky, Ohio

Others
 Sky Ride, a transporter bridge in Chicago, created as a symbol for the Century of Progress Worlds Fair in  1933
 skyRide, an airport express bus service by TheRide to Denver International Airport, United States
 New York Skyride, a simulator ride at the Empire State Building, New York City, United States
 Skyride, a chairlift of Sentosa Luge, Singapore
 Skyride Unlimited, a company owning KAXL radio station of the Bakersfield, California, United States
 Mayor of London's Sky Ride, an annual cycling event in London